Leung Che-cheung, SBS, MH, JP (born 3 December 1957 in Hong Kong) is a former member of Hong Kong Legislative Council (Geographical constituency New Territories West) and the former Chairman of the Yuen Long District Council for Tin Yiu in Tin Shui Wai. He is a member of Democratic Alliance for the Betterment of Hong Kong, a pro-Beijing party in Hong Kong and the president of the New Territories Association of Societies. He was awarded the Silver Bauhinia Star by the Hong Kong SAR Government in 2017.

Background
In 1998, Leung began serving as vice chairman of Yuen Long District Council, and was elected as chairman in 2008. In 2011, he joined the Election Committee for Regional District Council.  Leung was elected as a member of the Legislative Council of Hong Kong

In a town hall meeting on 11 August 2013 in Tin Shui Wai where Chief Executive Leung Chun-ying attended, some thugs-like Leung's supporters allegedly provoked and beat up protesters. Leung Che-cheung who hosted the Town Hall meeting invited a group of triad-related individuals to a dinner party and  called in supporters to support Leung prior to the meeting. Tang Sui-man, also known as "Four Eyes Man", representative of the villagers from Wang Toi Shan Ho Lik Pui Tsuen, Tsang Shu-wo, also known as "Tall Man Wo", chairman of Ping Shan Heung Rural Committee and a number of powerful triad related individuals were called into action.

In October 2019, Leung was criticised for his questionable qualification as a member of the Legislative Council after questioning when the council would discuss the controversial anti-mask law that was already passed over 10 days earlier.

In January 2021, after a HK$280 million funding request was passed without any officials present to answer his questions, Leung was informed that he had missed a deadline to request the secretariat to have officials present, despite being a lawmaker for 8 years.

References

External links
梁志祥──持續建設可持續社區
HK Legislative Council - Members' Biographies

1957 births
Living people
Members of the Regional Council of Hong Kong
District councillors of Yuen Long District
Democratic Alliance for the Betterment and Progress of Hong Kong politicians
New Territories Association of Societies politicians
HK LegCo Members 2012–2016
HK LegCo Members 2016–2021
Members of the Election Committee of Hong Kong, 2012–2017
Recipients of the Silver Bauhinia Star
Recipients of the Bronze Bauhinia Star